Justin Donati (born October 17, 1986) is an ice hockey forward, currently playing for the Brampton Beast of the ECHL. Justin played with his identical twin brother Tyler Donati on the Toronto St. Michael's Majors of the OHL, but this was ended when Tyler was traded to the Belleville Bulls.  Justin is the younger of the Donati twins by 7 minutes.  Neither brother was drafted to the NHL in 2006, but both attended Detroit Red Wings rookie camp. In 2007, Justin was invited to participate in the Calgary Flames rookie camp as a non-draft invitee.

Playing career
On January 8, 2005 Justin, along with his brother Tyler, was acquired from the Oshawa Generals to the Toronto St. Michael's Majors for Cal Clutterbuck. In February 2007 Justin was acquired from the Toronto St. Michael's Majors to the Sudbury Wolves.

Justin and his brother both attended the Detroit Red Wings rookie camp as non-draft invitees in August/Sept of 2006 and played well, both producing points regularly throughout the tournament games. Justin signed with the UPEI Panthers of the Atlantic University Sport conference in December 2007. A shoulder injury kept him out until early February, but he posted 10 points in his four games with the club.

On May 31, 2013, Donati left Norway and joined his brother in signing a one-year contract with Austrian club, HC TWK Innsbruck of the EBEL. .

On July 10, 2014 a free agent after a single season with Innsbruck, Donati signed a one-year contract in Sweden with Vita Hästen of the HockeyAllsvenskan.

Personal information
Justin and his brother Tyler are actively involved in the "points for Cancer" fund, with money for each point either Donati scores being matched by their respective hockey clubs going to research to finding a cure for ovarian cancer, which their mother Corinne was diagnosed with in 2003. She died in July 2006 but the "points for Cancer" fundraising continues in her name.

Career statistics

Awards
2005–06 OHL All-Star
2009–10 CCM Rookie of the Year

References

External links

1986 births
Binghamton Senators players
Brampton Beast players
Canadian ice hockey centres
Elmira Jackals (ECHL) players
Ice hockey people from Ontario
Las Vegas Wranglers players
Living people
Oshawa Generals players
People from Oakville, Ontario
Portland Pirates players
Sudbury Wolves players
Toronto St. Michael's Majors players
University of Prince Edward Island alumni
Canadian twins
Twin sportspeople
HC Thurgau players
HC TWK Innsbruck players
HC Vita Hästen players
Vålerenga Ishockey players
Canadian expatriate ice hockey players in Austria
Canadian expatriate ice hockey players in Norway
Canadian expatriate ice hockey players in the United States
Canadian expatriate ice hockey players in Switzerland
Canadian expatriate ice hockey players in Sweden